Byun Ho-young ( or  ; born 19 October 1945) is a former South Korean footballer. He played as a goalkeeper for South Korean national team in the 1974 Asian Games. After retirement, he became the president of the South Korean expatriates' association in Hong Kong in 2008.

Honours 
Seiko
Hong Kong First Division League: 1978–79, 1979–80
Hong Kong FA Cup: 1975–76, 1977–78, 1979–80
Hong Kong Senior Challenge Shield: 1975–76, 1976–77, 1978–79, 1979–80
Hong Kong Viceroy Cup: 1977–78, 1978–79

Sea Bee
Hong Kong FA Cup runner-up: 1981–82

Individual
Korean FA Best XI: 1973, 1974
Korean FA Player of the Year: 1974

References

External links 
 Byun Ho-young at KFA 
 

1945 births
Living people
Association football goalkeepers
South Korean footballers
South Korean expatriate footballers
South Korea international footballers
Hong Kong First Division League players
South Korean football managers
Expatriate footballers in Hong Kong
South Korean expatriate sportspeople in Hong Kong
Seiko SA players
Sea Bee players